In mathematics, especially in the field of module theory, the concept of pure submodule provides a generalization of direct summand, a type of particularly well-behaved piece of a module.  Pure modules are complementary to flat modules and generalize Prüfer's notion of pure subgroups.  While flat modules are those modules which leave short exact sequences exact after tensoring, a pure submodule defines a short exact sequence (known as a pure exact sequence) that remains exact after tensoring with any module.  Similarly a flat module is a direct limit of projective modules, and a pure exact sequence is a direct limit of split exact sequences.

Definition

Let R be a ring (associative, with 1), let M be a (left) module over R, let P be a submodule of M and let i: P →  M be the natural injective map. Then P is a pure submodule of M if, for any (right) R-module X, the natural induced map idX ⊗ i : X ⊗ P → X ⊗ M  (where the tensor products are taken over R) is injective.

Analogously, a short exact sequence

of (left) R-modules is pure exact if the sequence stays exact when tensored with any (right) R-module X. This is equivalent to saying that f(A) is a pure submodule of B.

Equivalent characterizations
Purity of a submodule can also be expressed element-wise; it is really a statement about the solvability of certain systems of linear equations. Specifically, P is pure in M if and only if the following condition holds: for any m-by-n matrix (aij) with entries in R, and any set y1, ..., ym of elements of P, if there exist elements x1, ..., xn in M such that

then there also exist elements x1′, ..., xn′ in P such that

Another characterization is: a sequence is pure exact if and only if it is the filtered colimit (also known as direct limit) of split exact sequences

Examples

 Every direct summand of M is pure in M. Consequently, every subspace of a vector space over a field is pure.

Properties
 Suppose

is a short exact sequence of R-modules, then: 
 C is a flat module if and only if the exact sequence is pure exact for every A and B.  From this we can deduce that over a von Neumann regular ring, every submodule of every R-module is pure.  This is because every module over a von Neumann regular ring is flat.  The converse is also true.  
 Suppose B is flat. Then the sequence is pure exact if and only if C is flat. From this one can deduce that pure submodules of flat modules are flat.
 Suppose C is flat. Then B is flat if and only if A is flat.

If    is pure-exact, and F is a finitely presented R-module, then every homomorphism from F to C can be lifted to B, i.e. to every u : F → C there exists v : F → B such that gv=u.

References

Module theory